Lindley is a suburb of Huddersfield, within the metropolitan borough of Kirklees in West Yorkshire, England.

The Huddersfield Royal Infirmary, Huddersfield's main hospital, is in Lindley. It is run by Calderdale and Huddersfield NHS Foundation Trust. In 1951, the scheme for building the new Infirmary was announced, at an initial cost of £5.5 million. Work started in 1957, but progress was slow. The hospital was officially opened only in 1967, by Prime Minister Harold Wilson, born in Huddersfield. Plans were approved in September 2021 for a new A&E department the existing 1960s A&E was "reaching near the end of its functional life and is no longer fit for purpose" according to the Director of Transformation and Partnerships for CHFT.

History
The name for Lindley comes from the Saxon for "flax meadow" or possibly from the Germanic word 'lind' denoting an area of linden (or lime) trees.

Probably established by the Angles in the 7th century as a farming community, it is mentioned in the Domesday Book under the names "Lilleia". In the reign of Edward the Confessor it was owned by Godwin, and in the reign of William the Conqueror it was being cultivated by Ulchel for Ilbert de Lacy, the Sheriff of Hertfordshire and descendant of the French noble family from Lassy.  At that time, Lindley consisted of two farmsteads totalling "5 quarantens by 2 quarantens".

The Lindley Clock Tower is the most prominent landmark in Lindley, standing at the junction between Lidget Street and Daisy Lea Lane.  This Art Nouveau clock tower was designed by the Manchester architect Edgar Wood in 1900 and erected by James Nield Sykes JP, in 1902.  The tower also features four buttress figures, four gargoyles and four friezes. The top of the tower is accessible via the doorway at its foot.

Another key building in Lindley is Lindley Liberal Club, situated adjacent to Lindley Clock Tower. The club has been in existence since its foundation stone was laid on 9 August 1887. The club came into use when building was completed the following year. This building is actually older than the Clock Tower, which was commissioned in 1902.

Lindley appeared top in a survey carried out in 2006 by the Royal Bank of Scotland. By creating an algorithm factoring aspects such as desirability, return on investment and affordability, the survey results listed the top 10 locations throughout the UK for first time buyers to get on the property ladder.

Climate

Band
Lindley Band was formed in the late 1830s and has been a major band in Huddersfield for most of its history. It was one of the leading bands in the UK from 1880 to 1910.
The band were featured in a 2008 episode of Life on Mars and also appeared in a 1950s film called Asylum. It is currently in the first section.

Schools
Lindley Junior and Infants School is situated on George Street next to a housing estate. It caters for age group 4 to 11, with an enrolment of approximately 500 pupils. Lindley Junior School won the Songs Of Praise School Choir of The Year competition in 2008 and 2016. They have appeared on Look North, and have previously taken first place in the local Mrs Sunderland Music Competition. The choirs are being run by the famous Alison North, MBE. There are currently four houses in Lindley Juniors: Oastler, Bronte, Rhodes and Delius. These houses engage in healthy competition, taking part in sport activities to gain house points. The house with the most house points at the end of the year receives the house trophy. Sports Day during the summer is another well-known competition where they can earn themselves even more house points. The school is under the supervision of Headteacher Mrs Jubbs currently.

See also
Listed buildings in Huddersfield (Lindley Ward)

References

Further reading
 Brook, Roy (1968): The Story of Huddersfield.

External links
 Virtual Huddersfield

Areas of Huddersfield